Itet, also known as Atet, was a royal woman who lived in ancient Egypt. She was the wife of Nefermaat, the eldest son of king Sneferu as well as a vizier and a religious leader in the royal court who officiated in the worship of Bastet. She was the mother of three daughters and many sons. Her son, Hemiunu, succeeded her husband as vizier. She and her husband are buried in mastaba 16 at Meidum.

Family
Fifteen of Itet and Nefermaat's offspring are named in their tomb in Meidum. Daughters Djefatsen and Isesu and sons Hemiunu, Isu, Teta, and Khentimeresh are depicted as adults, while daughter Pageti and sons Itisen, Inkaef, Serfka, Wehemka, Shepseska, Kakhent, Ankhersheretef, Ankherfenedjef, Buneb, Shepsesneb, and Nebkhenet are depicted as children. Her son, Hemiunu, is the vizier who is believed to have helped plan the Great Pyramids for Khufu and he often is referred to as its architect.

References 

27th-century BC women
26th-century BC women
26th-century BC Egyptian people
27th-century BC Egyptian people